"Zora sourit" (meaning "Zora Smiles") is the first single from Celine Dion's album, S'il suffisait d'aimer (1998). It was released on 14 September 1998 in Francophone countries. The song written by Jean-Jacques Goldman and his brother J. Kapler.

Background and release
"Zora sourit" music video was directed by Yannick Saillet in Miami, Florida and Aubervilliers near Paris and released in September 1998. It was included later on Dion's On ne change pas DVD.

In Quebec, "Zora sourit" entered the chart on 15 August 1998, topped it for five weeks and spent thirty-three weeks there in total. The single was released commercially in selected European countries, reaching number 12 in Belgium Wallonia, number 20 in France and number 25 in Switzerland. It was certified gold in Belgium (25,000) and gold in France (250,000 copies sold).

Dion performed "Zora sourit" live during early dates of her Let's Talk About Love Tour and her French concerts in 2017.

The recording of "Zora sourit" was included as a bonus on the Au cœur du stade DVD.

The song became later a part of the On ne change pas greatest hits compilation (2005).

Formats and track listings
European CD single
"Zora sourit" – 3:52
"Sur le même bateau" – 4:25

European CD Maxi and 12-inch maxi single
"Zora sourit" – 3:52
"Sur le même bateau" – 4:25
"Pour que tu m'aimes encore" – 4:14

Charts

Weekly charts

Year-end charts

Certifications and sales

Release history

References

External links

1998 singles
1998 songs
1990s ballads
Celine Dion songs
French-language songs
Pop ballads
Songs written by Jean-Jacques Goldman
Songs written by Robert Goldman (songwriter)